Zhou Libo may refer to:

Zhou Libo (writer) (1908–1979), Chinese novelist and translator
Zhou Libo (comedian) (born 1967), Chinese stand-up comedian